SM UB-13 was a German Type UB I submarine or U-boat in the German Imperial Navy during World War I. The submarine was probably sunk by a British mine net in April 1916.

UB-13 was ordered in October 1914 and was laid down at the AG Weser shipyard in Bremen in November. She carried two torpedoes for her two bow torpedo tubes and was also armed with a deck-mounted machine gun. UB-13 was broken into sections and shipped by rail to Antwerp for reassembly. She was launched in March 1915 and commissioned as SM UB-13 in April.

UB-13 spent her entire career in the Flanders Flotilla and sank 11 merchant ships, about half of them British fishing vessels. In March 1916, UB-13 was responsible for sinking the Dutch ocean liner , raising the ire of the Dutch public. Tubantia was the largest neutral vessel sunk during the war and among the 30 largest ships sunk by U-boats. On 25 April 1916, UB-13 was sunk with all hands.

Design and construction 
After the German Army's rapid advance along the North Sea coast in the earliest stages of World War I, the German Imperial Navy found itself without suitable submarines that could be operated in the narrow and shallow seas off Flanders. Project 34, a design effort begun in mid-August 1914, produced the Type UB I design: a small submarine that could be shipped by rail to a port of operations and quickly assembled.

UB-13 was part of the initial allotment of seven submarines—numbered  to —ordered on 15 October from AG Weser of Bremen, just shy of two months after planning for the class began. UB-13 was laid down by Weser in Bremen on 7 November. She had a single  Körting 4-cylinder diesel engine for surface travel, and a single  Siemens-Schuckert electric motor for underwater travel, both attached to a single propeller shaft.

UB-13 was armed with two  torpedoes in two bow torpedo tubes. She was also outfitted for a single  machine gun on deck. UB-13s standard complement consisted of one officer and thirteen enlisted men.

After work on UB-13 was complete at the Weser yard, she was readied for rail shipment. The process of shipping a UB I boat involved breaking the submarine down into what was essentially a knock down kit. Each boat was broken into approximately fifteen pieces and loaded onto eight railway flatcars. In February 1915, the sections of UB-13 were shipped to Antwerp for assembly in what was typically a two- to three-week process. After UB-13 was assembled and launched on 8 March, she was loaded on a barge and taken through canals to Bruges where she underwent trials.

Early career 
The submarine was commissioned into the German Imperial Navy as SM UB-13 on 6 April 1915 under the command of Oberleutnant zur See Walter Gustav Becker, a 29-year-old first-time U-boat commander. On 26 April, UB-13 joined the Flanders Flotilla, which had been organized on 29 March. When UB-13 joined the flotilla, Germany was in the midst of its first submarine offensive, begun in February. During this campaign, enemy vessels in the German-defined war zone, which encompassed all waters around the United Kingdom, were to be sunk. Vessels of neutral countries were not to be attacked unless they definitively could be identified as enemy vessels operating under a false flag.

Submarines of the Flanders Flotilla sank over 14,000 tons of merchant vessels in June 1915, and UB-13s first ship sunk, Dulcie, contributed almost one-seventh of that total. One man on Dulcie lost his life in the attack. Dulcie was the only ship sunk by UB-13 in June.

All three of the sunken ships were smacks—sailing vessels traditionally rigged with red ochre sails—which were stopped, boarded by crewmen from UB-16, and sunk with explosives.

In response to American demands after German submarines had sunk the Cunard Line steamer  in May 1915 and other high-profile sinkings in August and September, the chief of the Admiralstab, Admiral Henning von Holtzendorff, issued orders suspending the first offensive on 18 September. His directive ordered all U-boats out of the English Channel and the South-Western Approaches and required that all submarine activity in the North Sea be conducted strictly along prize regulations. On 20 February 1916, under the command of Kapitänleutnant Karl Neumann, who replaced Becker in December 1915, UB-13 captured a Belgian ship named Z10 David Marie and retained her as a prize. There are no further details about where Z10 David Marie was taken or her final disposition, but other ships captured as prizes by Flanders boats were sailed into Zeebrugge by prize crews.

Second submarine offensive 
By early 1916, the British blockade of Germany was beginning to have an effect on Germany and her imports. The Royal Navy had stopped and seized more cargo destined for Germany than the quantity of cargo sunk by German U-boats in the first submarine offensive. As a result, the German Imperial Navy began a second offensive against merchant shipping on 29 February. The final ground rules agreed upon by the German Admiralstab were that all enemy vessels in Germany's self-proclaimed war zone would be destroyed without warning, that enemy vessels outside the war zone would be destroyed only if armed, and—to avoid antagonizing the United States—that enemy passenger steamers were not to be attacked, regardless of whether in the war zone or not. The day after the beginning of the second offensive, Neumann and UB-13 sank four more fishing smacks northeast of Lowestoft. All four ships were boarded and sunk in the same manner as the three sunk the previous July.

SS Tubantia 

The Royal Holland Lloyd ship had been fully illuminated, with her name spelled out in electric lights between the twin funnels. Distress calls from Tubantia were heeded and all 80 passengers and 294 crew were rescued by three nearby ships before the ship foundered. Tubantia was the largest neutral ship sunk during the war, and among the 30 largest ships sunk by U-boats.

Germany initially tried to implicate British mines or torpedoes, but relented when confronted with evidence that it was one of their own torpedoes—which had been assigned to UB-13—that had sunk Tubantia. The Germans, however, presented a forged log from UB-13 that showed her nowhere near Tubantia at the time of the attack. Further, they reported, UB-13 had fired that specific torpedo at a British warship on 6 March—ten days before Tubantia was sunk—which would have been under her previous commander, Kapitänleutnant Neumann. The U.S. Minister to the Netherlands, Henry van Dyke, writing in Fighting for Peace in 1917, called this explanation "amazing" and derided it:This certain U-boat had fired this particular torpedo at a British war-vessel somewhere in the North Sea ten days before the Tubantia was sunk. The shot missed its mark. But the naughty undisciplined little torpedo went cruising around in the sea on its own hook for ten days waiting for a chance to kill somebody. Then the Tubantia came along and the wandering-Willy torpedo promptly, obstinately, ran into the ship and sank her. This was the explanation. Germany was not to blame.

The Dutch public was furious at what they believed a hostile German act, which caused German diplomats to spread rumors of an impending British invasion of the Netherlands to divert the unwanted attention.

Amidst all of the denials and diplomatic wrangling over Tubantias sinking, UB-13 continued to sink ships. On 31 March, off Southwold, Metz and UB-13 sank the British steamer Alacrity. The  ship was carrying ballast destined for Seaham Harbour when she went down with fourteen crewman. Twelve days later, in the Kentish Knock area, UB-13 sank the Danish ship Proeven. The 276 GRT sailing vessel was the last ship sunk by UB-13.

Sinking 
On the evening of 23 April 1916, UB-13 departed Zeebrugge for a patrol off the mouth of the Thames and was never heard from again. Author Dwight Messimer, in his book Verschollen: World War I U-boat Losses, reports that the British had deployed a new explosive anti-submarine net at position  in the early morning hours of 24 April. He suggests that it was possible UB-13 had set off some of the contact mines on the net, or possible that the submarine had struck a mine in one of the many British minefields off the Flemish coast. However, according to authors R. H. Gibson and Maurice Prendergast, in their book The German Submarine War, 1914–1918, UB-13 fouled the anchor cable of the British naval drifter Gleaner of the Sea on 24 April, and was depth charged by E.E.S.. Then for good measure, the British destroyer  deployed explosive sweeps against the submarine. Whatever the specific cause of her demise, all seventeen crewmen on board the submarine were killed.

Summary of raiding history

Notes

References

Bibliography 

 

 
 
 
 
 
 
 
 
 
 
 

German Type UB I submarines
Ships built in Bremen (state)
Ships built in Belgium
1915 ships
U-boats commissioned in 1915
World War I submarines of Germany
Maritime incidents in 1916
U-boats sunk in 1916
U-boats sunk by mines
World War I shipwrecks in the North Sea
Ships lost with all hands